Stanley Anthony "Stan" Stanczyk (May 10, 1925 – July 3, 1997) was an American weightlifter. Between 1946 and 1952 he won five consecutive world titles in three different weight classes, six consecutive national titles, as well as gold medals at the 1948 Summer Olympics and 1951 Pan American Games. In 1946–1949 he set seven ratified world records: four in the snatch, one in the clean and jerk and two in the total. Stanczyk finished second at the 1952 Summer Olympics and third at the 1953 and 1954 world championships.

During World War II Stanczyk served in the U.S. Army for three years. He retired in 1954 and opened a bowling alley in Miami combined with a restaurant, which he ran for 27 years together with his wife  Dorothy. During those years he competed in bowling, continued to lift weights, and trained other weightlifters. In 1991 he was inducted into the National Polish American Sports Hall of Fame.

References 

1925 births
1997 deaths
United States Army personnel of World War II
American male weightlifters
Weightlifters at the 1948 Summer Olympics
Weightlifters at the 1952 Summer Olympics
Olympic gold medalists for the United States in weightlifting
Olympic silver medalists for the United States in weightlifting
American people of Polish descent
Medalists at the 1952 Summer Olympics
Medalists at the 1948 Summer Olympics
Pan American Games gold medalists for the United States
Pan American Games medalists in weightlifting
People associated with physical culture
Weightlifters at the 1951 Pan American Games
World Weightlifting Championships medalists
Medalists at the 1951 Pan American Games
20th-century American people